Ayesha Dutt (born 5 June 1960) is an Indian film producer, former model, and actress. She is married to Bollywood actor Jackie Shroff and the mother of Tiger Shroff.

Early life
She was born to a Bengali father, Ranjan Dutt, an air vice marshal in the Indian Air Force, and Claude Marie Dutt De Cavey, a French national of Belgian descent.

Ayesha contested the Miss Young World contest in Manila. She did not make it to the finals, but was elected the most popular girl at the contest by her fellow contestants. She began her career as a model and became successful.

She acted in a Bollywood film Teri Baahon Mein opposite Mohnish Bahl in 1984.

Personal life
Dutt married her longtime boyfriend and Bollywood actor, Jackie Shroff on her birthday on 5 June 1987. She later turned into a film producer. The couple run a media company, Jackie Shroff Entertainment Limited. They jointly owned 10% shares in Sony TV since its launch until 2012 when they sold their stake and ended their 15-year-long association with Sony TV. The Shroffs have two children. Her elder child is also a Bollywood actor, Tiger Shroff (born 1990), and a daughter, Krishna Shroff (born 1993).

Filmography

Actress

Producer

References

External links
 
 

1960 births
Living people
Indian women film producers
Hindi film producers
Indian female models
Bengali actresses
Indian film actresses
Actresses in Hindi cinema
Place of birth missing (living people)
Indian people of Belgian descent
Actresses of European descent in Indian films
21st-century Indian actresses